Julian year may refer to:

 Julian year (astronomy), a time interval of exactly 365.25 Earth days
 Julian year (calendar), a year in the Julian calendar that is either 365 or 366 days, or 365.25 days on average